Crassispira degrangei is an extinct species of sea snail, a marine gastropod mollusk in the family Pseudomelatomidae, the turrids and allies. Fossils have been found in Oligocene strata of Aquitaine, France.

References

 Lozouet (P.), 2017 Les Conoidea de l’Oligocène supérieur (Chattien) du bassin de l’Adour (Sud-Ouest de la France). Cossmanniana, t. 19, p. 1-179

degrangei
Gastropods described in 1931